Matrice is a comune (municipality) in the Province of Campobasso in the Italian region Molise, located about  northeast of Campobasso.

Matrice borders the following municipalities: Campobasso, Campolieto, Castellino del Biferno, Montagano, Petrella Tifernina, Ripalimosani, San Giovanni in Galdo.

At the beginning of the 20th century, many residents of Matrice began to immigrate to the U.S.

Demographic evolution

References

Cities and towns in Molise